John W. "Candy" Nelson (March 14, 1849 – September 4, 1910) was a shortstop in Major League Baseball.

Biography
A native of Maine, Nelson entered professional baseball in Brooklyn in 1867. He made his major league debut in the National Association with the Troy Haymakers in 1872. 

In 1890, he was the oldest player in the American Association at age 41. A couple of years later, major publications described him as owning a milk route in Brooklyn. On the 1900 U.S. Census, Nelson listed "ball player" for his occupation. He died of heart problems at home in Brooklyn in 1910.

Sources

Major League Baseball shortstops
Brooklyn Eckfords (NABBP) players
New York Mutuals (NABBP) players
Troy Haymakers players
Brooklyn Eckfords players
New York Mutuals players
Indianapolis Blues players
Worcester Ruby Legs players
New York Metropolitans players
New York Giants (NL) players
Brooklyn Gladiators players
Troy Trojans players
Sportspeople from Brooklyn
Baseball players from New York City
Sportspeople from Portland, Maine
Baseball players from Maine
19th-century baseball players
1849 births
1910 deaths
Pittsburgh Allegheny players
Rochester (minor league baseball) players
Washington Nationals (minor league) players
Albany (minor league baseball) players
Brooklyn Atlantics (minor league) players
New York Metropolitans (minor league) players
Albany Governors players
Buffalo Bisons (minor league) players
Wilmington Blue Hens players
Burials at Cypress Hills Cemetery